The 1972–73 Serie A season was the 39th season of the Serie A, the top level of ice hockey in Italy. Nine teams participated in the league, and HC Bolzano won the championship by defeating SG Cortina in the final.

Final round

Final 
 HC Bolzano - SG Cortina 5:4

Placing round

External links
 Season on hockeytime.net

1972–73 in Italian ice hockey
Serie A (ice hockey) seasons
Italy